The first ladies and gentlemen of New York is the title held by the host or hostess of the New York Executive Mansion, usually the spouse or partner of the governor of New York, concurrent with the governor's term in office. The inaugural first lady of New York was Sarah Tappen, the wife of the first governor of New York, George Clinton.

See also
Governor of New York
List of governors of New York

References

 
Governor of New York (state)
Spouses of New York (state) politicians